In molecular biology, foldases are a particular kind of molecular chaperones that assist the non-covalent folding of proteins in an ATP-dependent manner. Examples of foldase systems are the GroEL/GroES and the DnaK/DnaJ/GrpE system.

References

See also 
 Holdase
 Chaperonin
 Co-chaperone

Molecular chaperones
Protein biosynthesis